The following lists the top 25 singles of 2008  in Australia from the Australian Recording Industry Association (ARIA) End of Year Singles Chart.

"Low" by Flo Rida featuring T-Pain was the biggest song of the year, peaking at #1 for three weeks and staying in the top 50 for 38 weeks. The longest stay at #1 was by Katy Perry's "I Kissed a Girl" which spent six weeks at the top spot. As of 12 February 2009, Lady Gaga's "Poker Face" has spent eight weeks on top of the charts, however five weeks were in 2008 and three in January 2009.

*5 weeks in 2008, and 3 in 2009

References 
General
http://www.aria.com.au/pages/aria-charts-end-of-year-charts-top-100-singles-2008.htm
Specific

Australian record charts
2008 in Australian music
Australia top 25 singles